Gicquel is a Breton surname. Notable people with the surname include:

 Roger Gicquel (1933–2010), TV journalist and presenter
Jean-Charles Gicquel (born 1967), French high jumper
Marc Gicquel (born 1977), French tennis player

French-language surnames